Athletes from the Islamic Republic of Iran competed at the 1996 Summer Paralympics in Atlanta, United States.

Competitors

Medal summary

Medal table

Medalists

Results by event

Athletics

Men

Powerlifting

Men

Shooting

Men

Women

Mixed

Volleyball

Men's sitting

References
International Paralympic Committee

Nations at the 1996 Summer Paralympics
1996
Paralympics